Terespolis (formerly) is a village in Kėdainiai district municipality, in Kaunas County, in central Lithuania. According to the 2011 census, the village had a population of 30 people. It is located 3 km from Gudžiūnai, by the Mairiškiai-Gudžiūnai road.

There is a former manor (build at the end of the 19th century) and a park (area 6 ha) with ponds, alleys and an orchard.  

At the end of the 19th century and the beginning of the 20th century Terespol was an estate of nobleman Chrapowycki. In the 1926 the estate was parceled and new villages were established in its place.

Demography

Images

References

Villages in Kaunas County
Kėdainiai District Municipality